Kombo South is one of the nine districts of the Gambia's Western Division, which is located to the south of the Gambia River in the southwest of the country. Kombo South is in the southwest of the division, between Kombo Central and Kombo North/Saint Mary. In the 2013 census, it had a population of 108,773. 

The district includes the southern Atlantic coast of the Gambia and the country's southernmost point.

References 

West Coast Division (The Gambia)
Districts of the Gambia